The 2014 Tour of Zhoushan Island is a stage race held in China, with a UCI rating of 2.2. It was the eleventh stage race of the 2014 Women's Elite cycling calendar.

Stages

Stage 1
21 May 2014 — Shengsi to Shengsi

Stage 2
22 May 2014 — Shengsi to Shengsi

Stage 3
23 May 2014 —  Zhujiajian to  Zhujiajian

Classification leadership table
Jerseys
 denotes the overall race leader.
 denotes the leader of the points classification.
 denotes the leader of the mountains classification.
 denotes the best Asian rider classification.

References

2014 in women's road cycling
2014 in Chinese sport
Tour of Zhoushan Island